Jostein Stige (born August 18, 1954) is a Norwegian sprint canoer who competed in the mid-1970s. He finished sixth in the K-4 1000 m event at the 1976 Summer Olympics in Montreal, Quebec, Canada.

References
Sports-Reference.com profile

External links

1954 births
Canoeists at the 1976 Summer Olympics
Living people
Norwegian male canoeists
Olympic canoeists of Norway
Place of birth missing (living people)